Ilsyah Ryan Reza or his popular name Reza Noah (born March 11, 1977), is former drummer of the musical group Noah. He left the band on January 1, 2015.

Early life and career
Reza moved to Bandung in 1990 to further his education. He joined a band called Black Forest. He was occasionally called to fill in as drummer with the band Noah, which at that time was called Peterpan. He replaced their original drummer Ari in 2001.

The band released six albums during Reza's tenure: Taman Langit, Bintang di Surga, Ost. Alexandria, Hari Yang Cerah, Sebuah Nama Sebuah Cerita and Seperti Seharusnya. Reza played drums with a band called Tridia when Peterpan was on hiatus in 2011.  He left Noah in January 2015 to pursue religious studies.

Filmography

Film

Books
 Kisah Lainnya (2012)
 6.903 mil – Cerita Dibalik Konser 5 Benua 5 Negara (2013)

Awards and nominations

References

External links
 
 
 'Kisah Lainnya', Buku Perjalanan Band Ariel 

1977 births
Living people
Indonesian musicians
Indonesian drummers
21st-century drummers
Noah (band) members
People from Poso Regency